The Meteorological Wing is a wing in the Air Component of the Belgian Armed Forces. It is responsible for providing meteorological information and training.

Organisation
The Meteorological Wing is organised into three groups:
the management
the Exploitation Group Meteo, an operational group consisting of a military weather forecasting centre, meteorological antennae spread across the Belgian territory, a school squadron and a meteo applications squadron.
the Support Group Meteo, a support group consisting of a technical and logistical squadron and an ICT squadron.

External links
Section of the website of the Belgian Ministry of Defence about the Meteorological Wing

Meteorological Wing
Beauvechain